The Polish Air Force is the aerial warfare branch of the Polish Armed Forces. Until July 2004 it was officially known as Wojska Lotnicze i Obrony Powietrznej. In 2014 it consisted of roughly 16,425 military personnel and about 475 aircraft, distributed among ten bases throughout Poland.

The Polish Air Force can trace its origins to the second half of 1917 and was officially established in the months following the end of World War I in 1918. During the invasion of Poland by Nazi Germany in 1939, 70% of its aircraft were destroyed. Most pilots, after the Soviet invasion of Poland on September 17, escaped via Romania and Hungary to continue fighting throughout World War II in allied air forces, first in France, then in Britain, and later also the Soviet Union.

History

Origins
Military aviation in Poland started even before the officially recognised date of regaining independence (11 November 1918). The very first independent units of the Polish Air Force, in service to the re-emerging Polish sovereign state, were actually formed before, in 1917, before World War I had come to an end. When the Russian Revolution began and the tsardom gradually lost control of the country, Polish pilots took advantage of the chaos and formed spontaneous aerial units in areas of present-day Belarus, south Ukraine, and by the Kuban river. Up until that point Polish pilots had only flown as members of Russian, German or Austro-Hungarian militaries. The first known air force units in service to the re-emerging Polish state were: I Polski Oddział Awiacyjny (1st Polish Aviation Squad) in Minsk formed on 19 June 1917, the 1st and 2nd Aviation Units of the 2nd Corps, the aerial fleet of the 4th Rifle Division, as well as the Samodzielny Polski Oddział Awiacyjny (Independent Polish Aviation Squad) in Odessa.

Establishment

Poland was under German and Austro-Hungarian occupation until the armistice, but the Poles started to take control as the Central Powers collapsed. Initially, the Polish air force consisted of mostly German and Austrian aircraft, left by former occupiers or captured from them, mostly during the Greater Poland Uprising. These planes were first used by the Polish Air Force in the Polish-Ukrainian War in late 1918, during combat operations centered around the city of Lwów (now Lviv). On 2 November 1918 pilot Stefan Bastyr performed the first combat flight of Polish aircraft from Lwów.

When the Polish-Soviet War broke out in February 1920, the Polish Air Force used a variety of former German and Austro-Hungarian, as well as newly acquired western-made Allied aircraft. Most common at that time were light bomber and reconnaissance aircraft, among most numerous were French Breguet 14 bombers, German LVG C.V reconnaissance aircraft, British Bristol F2B scouts and Italian Ansaldo Balilla fighters.

After the Polish-Soviet War ended in 1921, most of the worn out World War I aircraft were gradually withdrawn and from 1924 the air force started to be equipped with new French aircraft. In total in 1918–1924 there were 2160 aircraft in the Polish Air Force and naval aviation (not all in operable condition), in which there were 1384 reconnaissance aircraft and 410 fighters. From 1924 to 1930 the primary fighter of the Polish Air Force was the SPAD 61 and its main bombers were the French produced Potez 15 and the Potez 25, which was eventually manufactured in Poland under license from Aéroplanes Henry Potez.

The first Polish-designed and mass-produced aircraft to serve in the country's air force was a high wing fighter, the PWS-10, first manufactured in 1930 by the Podlasie Aircraft Factory.

Inter-war years

In 1933,  Zygmunt Pulawski's first high wing, all-metal aircraft, the PZL P.7a, was designed and produced, with 150 entering service. The design was followed by 30 improved PZL P.11a aircraft and a final design, the PZL P.11c, was delivered in 1935 and was a respectable fighter for its time; 175 entered service and it remained the only Polish fighter until 1939, by which time foreign aircraft design had overtaken it. Its final version, the PZL P.24, was built for export only and was bought by four countries. A new fighter prototype, the PZL.50 Jastrząb (Hawk), similar to the Seversky P-35 in layout, was curtailed by the Nazi invasion and two twin-engine heavy fighters, the PZL.38 Wilk and the PZL.48 Lampart, remained prototypes.

As far as bombers are concerned, the Potez 25 and Breguet 19 were replaced by an all-metal monoplane, the PZL.23 Karaś, with 250 built from 1936 onwards, but by 1939 the Karas was outdated. In 1938 the Polish factory PZL designed a modern twin-engine medium bomber, the PZL.37 Łoś (Elk). The Łoś had a bomb payload of 2580 kg and a top speed of 439 km/h. Unfortunately, only about 30 Łoś A bombers (single tailfin) and 70 Łoś B (twin tailfin) bombers had been delivered before the Nazi invasion.

As an observation and close reconnaissance plane, Polish escadres used the slow and easily damaged Lublin R-XIII, and later the RWD-14 Czapla. Polish naval aviation used the Lublin R-XIII on floats. Just before the war, some Italian torpedo planes, the CANT Z.506, were ordered, but only one was delivered, and it was without armament. The principal aircraft used to train pilots were the Polish-built high-wing RWD-8 and the PWS-26 biplane. In 1939, Poland ordered 160 MS-406s and 10 Hawker Hurricane fighters from abroad, but they were not delivered before the outbreak of the war.

1939

On 1 September 1939, at the beginning of the invasion of Poland, all the Polish combat aircraft had been dispersed to secondary airfields, contrary to a commonly-held belief, based on German propaganda, that they had all been destroyed by bombing at their airbases. The aircraft destroyed by German bombers on the airfields were mostly trainers. The fighters were grouped into 15 escadres; five of them constituted the Pursuit Brigade, deployed in the Warsaw area. Despite being obsolete, Polish PZL-11 fighters shot down over 170 German aircraft. The bombers, grouped in nine escadres of the Bomber Brigade, attacked armoured ground columns but suffered heavy losses. Seven reconnaissance- and 12 observation escadres, deployed to particular armies, were used primarily for reconnaissance. Part of the Polish Air Force was destroyed in the campaign; the surviving aircraft were either captured or withdrawn to Romania, Hungary, Lithuania, Latvia, Slovenia or Sweden, whose air forces subsequently employed these aircraft for their own use (in the case of Romania until 1956). A great number of pilots and aircrew managed to escape to France and then to Britain, where they played a significant part in the defence of the United Kingdom against Nazi invasion, during the Battle of Britain. Prior to the conflict Poland also bought 234 planes abroad. First of them were on delivery when the conflict started. These were Hawker Hurricane (14 planes), Morane-Saulnier 406 (120 planes) and Fairey Battle (100 planes). The ship SS Lassell with 14 Hawker Hurricanes on board left Liverpool on 28 August 1939, deliveries from France were also on way when the conflict broke out.

Strength of Polish Air Force on 1 September 1939

1940 (France)

After the fall of Poland, the Polish Air Force started to regroup in France. The only complete unit created before the German attack on France was the GC I/145 fighter squadron, flying Caudron C.714 light fighters. It was the only unit operating the C.714 at the time. The Polish pilots were also deployed to various French squadrons, flying on all types of French fighters, but mostly on the MS-406. After the surrender of France, many of these pilots managed to escape to Britain to continue the fight against the Luftwaffe.

1940–1947 (United Kingdom)

Following the fall of France in 1940, Polish units were formed in the United Kingdom, as a part of the Royal Air Force and known as the Polish Air Force (PAF). Four Polish squadrons were formed:

 300 Squadron and 301 Squadron flew bombers, 
 302 Squadron and 303 Squadron flew Hawker Hurricane fighters.

The two Polish fighter squadrons first saw action in the third phase of the Battle of Britain in August 1940, with much success; the pilots were battle-hardened and Polish flying skills had been well learned from the invasion of Poland. The pilots were regarded as fearless, sometimes bordering on reckless. Nevertheless, success rates were very high in comparison to UK and Empire pilots. 303 Squadron became the most efficient RAF fighter squadron at that time. Many Polish pilots also flew individually in other RAF squadrons.

As World War II progressed, a further twelve Polish squadrons were created in the United Kingdom:

 No. 304 Polish Bomber Squadron (bomber, then Coastal Command), 
No. 305 Polish Bomber Squadron (bomber),
No. 306 Polish Fighter Squadron (fighter),
No. 307 Polish Night Fighter Squadron (night fighter),
No. 308 Polish Fighter Squadron (fighter),
No. 309 Polish Fighter-Reconnaissance Squadron (reconnaissance, then fighter),
No. 315 Polish Fighter Squadron (fighter),
No. 316 Polish Fighter Squadron (fighter),
No. 317 Polish Fighter Squadron (fighter),
No. 318 Polish Fighter-Reconnaissance Squadron (fighter-reconnaissance),
No. 663 Polish Air Observation Post Squadron  (air observation/artillery spotting),
 and the Polish Fighting Team also known as "Skalski's Circus", attached to 145 Squadron RAF.

The fighter squadrons initially flew Hurricanes, then switched to Spitfires, and eventually to North American Mustangs. 307 Squadron, like other night fighter squadrons (such as 410 Squadron Royal Canadian Air Force), flew Boulton-Paul Defiants, Bristol Beaufighters and finally de Havilland Mosquitoes. The bomber squadrons were initially equipped with Fairey Battles and Vickers Wellingtons. 300 Squadron was later assigned Avro Lancasters, 301 Squadron Handley Page Halifaxes and Consolidated Liberators and 305 Squadron, de Havilland Mosquitoes and North American Mitchells. 663 Squadron (air observation/artillery spotting) flew Auster AOP IIIs and Vs. After the war, all equipment was returned to the British, but only some of the pilots and crews actually returned to Poland, with many settling in the United Kingdom, some of whom returned to Poland in 1989 after the fall of communism.

1943–1945 (Soviet Union)

Along with the Polish People's Army (Ludowe Wojsko Polskie) in the USSR, the Polish People's Air Force (Ludowe Lotnictwo Polskie) was created, in defence of the Soviet Union against Nazi invasion. Three regiments were formed in late 1943:

 the 1st Fighter Regiment "Warszawa", (equipped with Yak-1 and Yak-9 aircraft), 
 the 2nd Night Bomber Regiment "Kraków" (flying Polikarpov Po-2 aircraft – produced in Poland as the CSS-13 from 1949 onwards), 
 and the 3rd Assault Regiment (flying Ilyushin Il-2 aircraft) were formed.

During 1944–5, further regiments were created, coming together to form the 1st Mixed Air Corps, consisting of a bomber division, an assault division, a fighter division and a mixed division.  After the war, these returned to Poland and gave birth to the air force of the People's Republic of Poland.

1949–1989
In 1949, the Li-2sb transport aircraft was adapted into a bomber and in 1950, Poland received Petlyakov Pe-2 and Tupolev Tu-2 bombers from the Soviet Union along with USB-1 and USB-2 training bombers. In 1950 also, the Yak-17 fighter came into service, as did the Ilyushin Il-12 transport and the Yak-18 trainer. From 1951 onwards, the Polish Air Force was equipped with Yak-23 jet fighters and MiG-15 jets, along with a training version, the MiG-15 UTI, and later, in 1961, the MiG-17.

As well as Soviet-produced aircraft, from 1952 onwards Soviet MiG-15 and later MiG-17 fighters were produced under licence in Poland as the Lim-1, Lim-2 and later the Lim-5. A domestic ground attack variant of the Lim-5M was developed as the Lim-6bis in 1964. The only jet bomber used by the Polish Air Force during this period was the Ilyushin Il-28, from 1952 onwards. Poland used only a small number of MiG-19s from 1959, in favour of the MiG-21 from 1963 onwards, which became its main supersonic fighter. This aircraft was used in numerous variants from MiG-21F-13, through MiG-21PF and MF to MiG-21bis. Later, the Polish Air Force received 37 MiG-23s (1979) and 12 MiG-29s (1989).

The main fighter-bomber and ground attack aircraft after 1949 was the Il-10 (a training version, the UIl-10, entering service in 1951). From 1965 onwards, Poland also used a substantial number of Su-7Bs for bombing and ground attack, replaced with 27 Sukhoi Su-20s in 1974 and 110 Sukhoi Su-22s in 1984.

Propeller-driven training aircraft, the Junak-2 (in service since 1952), the TS-9 Junak-3 (in service since 1954) and the PZL TS-8 Bies (since 1958) were later replaced by a jet trainer, the domestically built TS-11 Iskra. Another Polish jet trainer, the PZL I-22 Iryda, was used for some time but, because of continuing problems, all machines were returned to PZL for modification and did not resume service. The Yak-12 was used as a multirole aircraft from 1951, the An-2 from 1955 and subsequently the Wilga-35 P.

Transport aircraft used by the Polish Air Force during this period included: the Il-14 (first in service in 1955), the Il-18 (first in service in 1961), the An-12B (first in service in 1966), the An-26 (first in service in 1972), the Yak-40 (first in service in 1973) and the Tupolev Tu-154. A number of helicopters were used by the Polish Army: the SM-1 (a Mil Mi-1 manufactured under licence), which was a multirole helicopter, in operation since 1956; the Mil Mi-4, multirole, since 1958; the PZL SM-2, multirole, since 1960; the Mil Mi-2 and Mil Mi-8 (later also Mil Mi-17), multirole, since 1968 and the Mil Mi-24, a combat helicopter, since 1976. Also the Mil Mi-14, an amphibious helicopter, and the Mil Mi-6, both used as transports.

In 1954, the Polish Air Force was merged with the Air Defence Force, creating the Air and Country Air Defence Forces (Wojska Lotnicze i Obrony Przeciwlotniczej Obszaru Kraju  – WLiOPL OK), a military organisation composed of both flying and anti-aircraft units. In 1962, the WLiOPL OK were separated back again into their two original component bodies: the Air Force (Wojska Lotnicze) and the Country Air Defence Force (Wojska Obrony Powietrznej Kraju).

Present-day operations

After political upheaval and the collapse of the Soviet Union in 1991, and a consequent reduction in the state of military anxiety in the whole of Europe, the Polish Air Force saw reductions in size. On July 1, 1990, the Polish Air Force and the Air Defence Force were merged again (Wojska Lotnicze i Obrony Powietrznej – WLiOP or WLOP). The attack capability of this force consisted primarily of MiG-21s, MiG-23s, MiG-29s, Su-20s and Su-22s. The remaining Lim-6bis were withdrawn in the early 1990s, followed soon afterwards by the withdrawal of the remaining Su-20 aircraft. The small number of remaining MiG-23s were withdrawn by 1999. Throughout the 1990s, Poland had not purchased any new combat aircraft and only managed to acquire further MiG-29s from the Czech Republic in 1995 and from Germany in 2004. MiG-21s were finally withdrawn from service in 2003. In 2004, the only remaining combat aircraft flown by the WLiOP were the MiG-29 and the Su-22. As of 2010, the fleet of Su-22s is in need of modernization to retain any value as a combat aircraft and its future is unclear.

In 2002, the F-16C/D Block 52+ from the American company Lockheed Martin was chosen as a new multirole fighter for the WLiOP, the first deliveries taking place in November 2006 and continued until 2008 under Peace Sky program. As of 2011 the Polish Air Force has three squadrons of F-16s: two stationed at the 31st Tactical Air Base near Poznań and the 10th Tactical Squadron at the 32nd Air Base near Łask. The acquisition of the US F-16 was not without fierce competition from European aerospace companies; the sale was hotly pursued by the French company Dassault, with their Mirage 2000 and by the Swedish company Saab, with the JAS 39 Gripen. The Polish Block 52+ F-16s are equipped with the latest Pratt and Whitney F-100-229 afterburning turbofan engines, and the avionics suite includes the APG-68(V)9 terrain mapping radar system and the ALQ-211(V)4 electronic warfare suite.  All Polish F-16s can carry modern US precision ordnance, ranging from the JDAM/JSOW to the latest in export-certificate-authorized air-to-air weaponry (including the AIM-120C-5 and AIM-9X).

In the aftermath of the presidential Tu-154 crash in 2010 and later Polish-led investigation, the 36th Special Aviation Regiment, responsible for transporting the President and the Polish Government, was disbanded, while the defense minister resigned. A new unit, the 1st Air Base, replaced the 36th regiment. Between June 2010 and December 2017 most official flights were served by two leased Embraer E-175 operated by the LOT Polish Airlines. On 14 November 2016 the Defense Ministry ordered two Gulfstream G550 VIP planes. On 31 March 2017 a deal with Boeing Company was signed to supply two Boeing Business Jet 2 and one Boeing 737-800 for the head of state and the government transport.

On 27 February 2014 Poland signed a €280 million contract with Alenia Aermacchi for 8 M-346 Master advanced training jets. The first two Masters arrived in Poland accompanied by Team Iskry on November 14, 2016.

On 11 December 2014 Polish officials signed a contract with the United States for the purchase of 70 AGM-158 Joint Air to Surface Stand off Missile, for US$250 million. Also contained in the contract are upgrades to the fleet of Polish F-16s to be completed by Lockheed Martin.

On 28 May 2019, the Polish Minister of Defence announced that Poland had sent a request for quotation for the acquisition of 32 F-35A aircraft. On 11 September 2019, the Department of Defense Security Cooperation Agency announced that Poland had been cleared to purchase 32 F-35A fighters, along with associated equipment, for an estimated cost of $6.5 billion. On 27 September 2019 the US Congress approved the sale. On 31 January 2020, Poland signed a $4.6 billion deal for 32 F-35 fighters.

On 8 March 2022, the Polish government offered to transfer its entire MiG-29 fleet to the US government via Ramstein Air Base as lethal aid to the Ukrainian air force against the ongoing Russian invasion in return for aircraft of corresponding operational capabilities (most likely F-16s). The exchange was eventually not carried out.

Equipment

Aircraft 

Note: Three C-17 Globemaster III's are available through the Heavy Airlift Wing based in Hungary.

Air Defence

Radars 
The 3rd Wrocław Radio Engineering Brigade has several radar types under its command including the Italian made RAT-31DL a AESA system, and the Polish made NUR-15 radar which provides a 3D picture of the controlled airspace. The NUR-31 a mobile unit, employing a medium-range airspace control radar.

Structure

Armed Forces General Command

Ranks and insignia

Officers

Other ranks

Qualification badges
The current aviator badge of the Polish Air Force has been in use since the 1920s. The badge is called gapa and represents silver eagle in flight with gold laurel wreath in the bill. Navigator/Observer badge (below) represents the same eagle, but in gold with added lightning bolts. The gapa is worn in the usual place on the upper left breast above the pocket, but unlike other air forces it is suspended on a chain. It adorned the uniform of Polish Air Force officers in the RAF during World War II along with their RAF wings. In the combat version (for at least 7 flights in combat conditions) the badge has a green laurel wreath.

See also
 Stefan Stec, creator of the Szachownica Lotnicza Polish national military aircraft insignia
 Stanisław Targosz, former commander-in-chief of the Polish Air Force
 Team Iskry
 Orlik Team
 List of aircraft of Poland, World War II
 Polish Land Forces Aircraft
 Polish Naval Aviation
 Polish Special Forces Aircraft

References

Bibliography

Further reading
 Air Forces Monthly, May 1999 (for details of reorganisation from regiments into squadrons)

External links

 Official website of Polish Air Force
 Polish Air Force history
 Polish Air Force unit insignias, gallery of badges with annotation